The XV Bolivarian Games (Spanish: Juegos Bolivarianos) were a multi-sport event held between 12–21 August 2005 in Armenia and Pereira, Colombia. Some events took place in Cartagena de Indias and in Bogotá.  The Games were organized by the Bolivarian Sports Organization (ODEBO).

The opening ceremony took place on August 12, 2005, at the Estadio Hernán Ramírez Villegas in Pereira, Colombia.  The Games were officially opened by Colombian president Álvaro Uribe.  Torch lighter was former road racing cyclist Rubén Darío Gómez, gold medallist at the 1961 Bolivarian Games. The athlete's oath was sworn by weightlifter Óscar Figueroa

Venues 
Armenia hosted the following competitions:
athletics (Pista Atlética La Villa), basketball (Coliseo del Café), billiards (Bolo Club de Armenia), boxing (Coliseo Municipal de La Tebaida), fencing (Coliseo Colegio San Luis Rey), football (Estadio Centenario), artistic gymnastics (Coliseo de Gimnasia), rhythmic gymnastics (Coliseo del Sur), karate (Coliseo Municipal de Calarca), roller speed skating road (Pista Estadio Centenario), roller speed skating track (Patinodromo Parque de la Vida), squash (Canchas Universidad del Quindío and Portal del Quindío), table tennis (Coliseo Universidad del Quindío), wrestling (Coliseo del INEM)

Pereira hosted the following competitions:
archery (Cancha Liga de Fútbol Villa Olímpica), beach volleyball (Parque Metropolitano del Café), bowling (Bolera Pereira), BMX racing (Parque Metropolitano del Café), mountain biking (Parque Metropolitano del Café), road cycling, track cycling (Velódromo Alfonso Hurtado Sarria), diving (Piscinas Olímpicas Villa), football (Estadio Hernán Ramírez Villegas), judo (Coliseo Menor), racquetball (Canchas Universidad Tecnológica de Pereira), shooting (Club de Tiro Punto 30), swimming (Piscinas Olímpicas Villa), taekwondo (Coliseo Menor), tennis (Tenis Country Club), volleyball (Coliseo Mayor), weightlifting (Coliseo Instituto Técnico Superior)

Cartagena hosted the following competitions:
baseball† (Estadio 11 de Noviembre), canoeing (Laguna Luruaco), softball† (Estadio Unidad Deportiva El Campestre), triathlon (Boca Grande and Castillo Grande), yachting (Bahía de Cartagena) 
†: Event initially scheduled, but cancelled at short notice.

Bogotá hosted the following competitions:
equestrianism (Country Club), water skiing (Parque Simón Bolívar)

Participation 
About 2026 athletes from 6 countries were reported to participate:

 (208)
 (608)
 (373)
 (18)
 (201)
 (615)

Sports
Both baseball and softball competitions were cancelled at short notice.  The following 28 sports were explicitly mentioned:

Aquatic sports 
 Diving
 Swimming
 Archery 
 Athletics
 Basketball
 Billiards
 Bowling
 Boxing
 Canoeing
Cycling 
 BMX racing
 Mountain biking
 Road cycling
 Track cycling
 Equestrian
 Fencing
 Football‡
Gymnastics 
 Artistic gymnastics
 Rhythmic gymnastics
 Judo
 Karate
 Racquetball
 Roller speed skating
 Sailing
 Shooting
 Squash
 Table tennis
 Taekwondo
 Tennis
 Triathlon
Volleyball 
 Beach volleyball
 Volleyball
 Water skiing
 Weightlifting
 Wrestling

‡: The competition was reserved to youth representatives (U-17).

Medal count
The medal count for these Games is tabulated below. This table is sorted by the number of gold medals earned by each country.  The number of silver medals is taken into consideration next, and then the number of bronze medals.

External links
 Official site

References 

 
Bolivarian Games
Bolivarian Games
Bolivarian Games
Bolivarian Games
Bolivarian Games
Multi-sport events in Colombia
Pereira, Colombia
Armenia, Colombia
August 2005 sports events in South America